Bonald or Bonalde may refer to:

 Honoré de Bonald (1894–?), aviator
 Juan Antonio Pérez Bonalde (1846–1892), poet
 Louis Gabriel Ambroise de Bonald (1754–1840), French philosopher and politician
 Victor de Bonald (1780–1871), son
 Louis Jacques Maurice de Bonald (1787–1870), son

See also
 Bonalds Island, Canada